Armand Borel (21 May 1923 – 11 August 2003) was a Swiss mathematician, born in La Chaux-de-Fonds, and was a permanent professor at the Institute for Advanced Study in Princeton, New Jersey, United States from 1957 to 1993. He worked in algebraic topology, in the theory of Lie groups, and was one of the creators of the contemporary theory of linear algebraic groups.

Biography
He studied at the ETH Zürich, where he came under the influence of the topologist Heinz Hopf and Lie-group theorist Eduard Stiefel. He was in Paris from 1949: he applied the Leray spectral sequence to the topology of Lie groups and their classifying spaces, under the influence of Jean Leray and Henri Cartan. With Hirzebruch, he significantly developed the theory of characteristic classes in the early 1950s.

He collaborated with Jacques Tits in fundamental work on algebraic groups, and with Harish-Chandra on their arithmetic subgroups. In an algebraic group G a Borel subgroup H is one minimal with respect to the property that the homogeneous space G/H is a projective variety. For example, if G is GLn then we can take H to be the subgroup of upper triangular matrices. In this case it turns out that H is a maximal solvable subgroup, and that the parabolic subgroups P between H and G have a combinatorial structure (in this case the homogeneous spaces G/P are the various flag manifolds). Both those aspects generalize, and play a central role in the theory.

The Borel−Moore homology theory applies to general locally compact spaces, and is closely related to sheaf theory.

He published a number of books, including a work on the history of Lie groups. In 1978 he received the Brouwer Medal and in 1992 he was awarded the Balzan Prize "For his fundamental contributions to the theory of Lie groups, algebraic groups and arithmetic groups, and for his indefatigable action in favour of high quality in mathematical research and the propagation of new ideas" (motivation of the Balzan General Prize Committee). He was a member of the American Academy of Arts and Sciences, the United States National Academy of Sciences, and the American Philosophical Society.

He died in Princeton. He used to answer the question of whether he was related to Émile Borel alternately by saying he was a nephew, and no relation.

Famous quotations
"I feel that what mathematics needs least are pundits who issue prescriptions or guidelines for presumably less enlightened mortals." (Oeuvres IV, p. 452)

See also
Borel–Weil–Bott theorem
Borel cohomology
Borel conjecture
Borel construction
Borel subgroup
Borel subalgebra
Borel fixed-point theorem
Borel's theorem
Borel–de Siebenthal theory
Borel–Moore homology
Baily–Borel compactification
Linear algebraic group
Spin structure

Publications

References

Sources

External links
 "Armand Borel"  – obituary on Institute for Advanced Study website
 
 Mark Goresky, "Armand Borel", Biographical Memoirs of the National Academy of Sciences (2019)

1923 births
2003 deaths
ETH Zurich alumni
Institute for Advanced Study faculty
Topologists
Algebraic geometers
Brouwer Medalists
20th-century Swiss mathematicians
Nicolas Bourbaki
Members of the French Academy of Sciences
Members of the United States National Academy of Sciences
Group theorists
People from La Chaux-de-Fonds
Members of the American Philosophical Society